The Authors' Licensing and Collecting Society (ALCS) is a British organisation that works to ensure that writers are fairly compensated for any of their works that are copied, broadcast or recorded. It has operated in the United Kingdom since 1977. From that year to 2016, the ALCS distributed over £450 million to authors, and at the end of 2016 had in excess of 90,000 members.

History
ALCS was founded in 1977 after a long campaign in the United Kingdom by the Writers' Action Group (WAG) for writers to receive remuneration for the lending of their works by libraries. Then known as the Authors' Lending and Copyright Society, it was incorporated on 26 April 1977 to handle:

payments from Verwertungsgesellschaft Wort (VG Wort – the Word Exploitation Corporation) for the German public lending right (PLR);
the British PLR;
Belgian cable television; and
reprography (photocopying) royalties.

However, the organization that was eventually responsible for distributing the fees obtained from the lending of books in libraries was the Public Lending Right.

In 1982, The Copyright Licensing Agency was founded by ALCS and the Publishers Licensing Society (PLS). ALCS receives the majority of its income (65–70%) from the CLA's photocopying licensing schemes.

Aims and operation
ALCS represents the interests of many UK writers and aims to ensure they are fairly compensated for any works that are copied, broadcast or recorded. The organisation is dedicated to protecting and promoting authors' rights:

by encouraging the establishment of collective licensing schemes, where appropriate, and ensuring that fees resulting from such schemes are efficiently collected and distributed; and
by building an understanding of the value of the contribution writers make to society.

ALCS's Ordinary Members sign a mandate that authorizes the Society to license and collect royalties on their behalf. ALCS is granted authority to exercise rights on each author's behalf as part of schemes for the collective administration of royalties in the UK and abroad. The rights range from photocopying, scanning and cable retransmission in the UK and internationally to reproduction in journals. The authority entitles ALCS in agreed circumstances to permit or forbid the exercise of the rights, grant licences, collect fees for use and damages for misuse and take action to defend and protect the rights. ALCS works closely with other writers organisations such as The Society of Authors and Writers' Guild of Great Britain.

From its inception in 1977, ALCS has distributed over £450 million to authors, and in the financial year 2015-2016 it paid £28 million to over 70,000 writers.

As an authority on copyright matters and authors' interests, the ALCS is committed to fostering an awareness of intellectual property issues among the writing community. It monitors matters affecting copyright both in the UK and internationally, and makes regular representations on writers' behalf to the UK government and the European Commission. ALCS also administers the All Party Writers Group.

Governance
The ALCS is governed by a board of 9 directors, the majority of whom are working writers.  The Board is responsible for the overall performance of the Society, which is incorporated as a company limited by guarantee.

References

External links
The Authors' Licensing and Collecting Society website

British literature
 
Clubs and societies in the United Kingdom
Copyright collection societies
Media and communications in the City of London
Organisations based in the City of London
Organizations established in 1977
1977 establishments in the United Kingdom